The Rome–Pescara railway is an Italian  long railway line, that connects Rome with Tivoli, Avezzano, Sulmona and Pescara. The route operates through the regions of Lazio and Abruzzo.

History

The line was opened in stages between 1873 and 1888.

Usage
The line is used by the following service(s):

Regional services (Treno regionale) Pescara- Chieti - Sulmona - Avezzano - Tivoli - Rome
Regional services (Treno regionale) Teramo - Giulianova - Pescara - Chieti - Sulmona - Avezzano
Regional services (Treno regionale) Avezzano - Tivoli - Rome

See also 
 List of railway lines in Italy

References

Footnotes

Sources
 
 
 
 

Railway lines in Lazio
Railway lines in Abruzzo
Railway lines opened in 1873